Caitlin E Mair (born 5 May 2003) is an Australian cricketer who plays as a right-handed batter and wicket-keeper for Queensland in the Women's National Cricket League (WNCL).

Domestic career
Mair plays grade cricket for Sandgate-Redcliffe District Cricket Club. She made her debut for Queensland against South Australia in the WNCL on 6 March 2022, taking two catches. She went on to play six matches overall in the tournament, taking 12 catches and making 4 stumpings, as well as scoring 41 runs. She played eight matches for the side in the 2022–23 Women's National Cricket League season, scoring 50 runs and making 14 dismissals.

References

External links

Caitlin Mair at Cricket Australia

2003 births
Living people
Place of birth missing (living people)
Australian women cricketers
Queensland Fire cricketers